George Rowley (4 April 1782 – 5 October 1836) was Dean and Master of University College, Oxford and Vice-Chancellor of Oxford University.

Education
Rowley was educated at John Roysse's Free School in Abingdon-on-Thames (now Abingdon School).

Career
George Rowley was the Dean of University College in the early 19th century, at the time of Percy Bysshe Shelley's expulsion for writing the pamphlet The Necessity of Atheism in 1811. He became Master of University College from 1821 to 1836 and later Vice-Chancellor of Oxford University from 1832 to 1836.  He was elected as a Fellow of the Royal Society on 14 November 1811.

See also
 List of Old Abingdonians

References

1782 births
1836 deaths
People educated at Abingdon School
Fellows of University College, Oxford
Masters of University College, Oxford
Vice-Chancellors of the University of Oxford
Fellows of the Royal Society